The Alabama Crimson Tide college football team compete as part of the National Collegiate Athletic Association (NCAA) Division I Football Bowl Subdivision, representing the University of Alabama in the Western Division of the Southeastern Conference (SEC). Alabama has played their home games at Bryant–Denny Stadium in Tuscaloosa, Alabama since 1929.

The Crimson Tide acknowledge 18 national championships, from various and legitimate organizations of their time, 13 of which were awarded by the AP or Coaches' wire-service polls. Alabama has 32 conference championships and holds NCAA records with 73 postseason bowl game appearances and 44 bowl game victories. The Crimson Tide has also had 11 undefeated seasons, a longest winning streak of 28 games between 1978 and 1980 and a home winning streak of 57 games between 1963 and 1982. Alabama leads the SEC West Division with 13 appearances in the SEC Championship Game, and has a winning record against every SEC team. The Associated Press (AP) ranks Alabama 5th all-time in total appearances in the AP Poll. With 954 official wins in over 126 seasons of football, Alabama ranks sixth all-time in win–loss records in the NCAA.

Football was introduced to the university by W. G. Little in 1892. The first win in the history of the program came in its inaugural game, a 56–0 shutout over Birmingham High School on November 11, 1892. From 1892 to 1894, Alabama competed as a football independent, before they joined the Southern Intercollegiate Athletic Association (SIAA) as a charter member in 1895. From 1895 to 1921, Alabama saw some success, as they had only three losing seasons as a member of the SIAA. In 1922, Alabama left the SIAA and became a charter member of the Southern Conference (SoCon). As a member of the Southern Conference, Alabama won conference championships in 1924, 1925, 1926 and 1930. Additionally, Alabama won their first three National Championships in the 1925, 1926 and 1930 seasons.

By 1933, Alabama again switched conferences, joining the SEC as a charter member. Alabama won the first SEC title in 1933 and its fourth and fifth national championship in the 1934 and 1941 seasons. After winning five national championships and nine conference championships through 1946, Alabama saw a decline between 1946 and 1957 and captured a single conference title. After they only won four games over a period of three seasons, Bear Bryant was hired as head coach in 1958. Under his guidance Alabama won thirteen SEC championships and national championships in the 1961, 1964, 1965, 1973, 1978 and 1979 seasons. After the retirement of Bryant in 1982, Alabama had two coaches, and won one SEC championship before Gene Stallings was hired in 1990. Stallings coached Alabama for seven years, won a national championship in 1992 season, an SEC championship that same season, and four SEC West Division titles. His retirement was followed by a succession of four coaches who only won one SEC championship among them.

In 2007 Alabama hired current coach Nick Saban, who led the program to their thirteenth national championship in the 2009 season, fourteenth in the 2011 season, fifteenth in the 2012 season, sixteenth in the 2015 season, seventeenth in the 2017 season, and eighteenth in the 2020 season. Through the 2020 season, Alabama has compiled an official overall record of 929 wins, 331 losses, 43 ties and has appeared in 73 bowl games, with the most recent appearance and win coming in the 2021 College Football Playoff National Championship.

Seasons

Totals

Notes

References
General

Specific

Alabama

Alabama Crimson Tide football seasons